William James Bordill (born 24 July 1993 in Sandbach) is a Scottish rugby union player who plays for the Ayr RFC at the loose forward position. He formerly played for Glasgow Warriors.
Bordill played for Glasgow Warriors from 2013 to 2016. When not involved with the Warriors, he played for Ayr RFC.

He has represented Scotland at various age grades and at Club XV.

In 2016, he was released by the Warriors and now solely plays for Ayr.

References

External links
 Will Bordill profile, Glasgow Warriors

1993 births
Living people
Rugby union players from Cheshire
Scottish rugby union players
Glasgow Warriors players
Ayr RFC players
Sale Sharks players
People from Sandbach
Scotland Club XV international rugby union players
Rugby union flankers